Mian Rud-e Zaruni (also Romanized as Mīān Rūd-e Ẕarūnī; also known as Pol-e Mādīānrūd, Mīānrūd, and Mīān Rūd) is a village in Kuhdasht-e Jonubi Rural District, in the Central District of Kuhdasht County, Lorestan Province, Iran. At the 2006 census, its population was 189, in 40 families.

References 

Towns and villages in Kuhdasht County